Dating Amber (originally titled Beards) is an Irish comedy-drama film directed by David Freyne. The film features two closeted teenagers in 1990s Ireland who decide to start a fake relationship. The film was produced with assistance from Fis Éireann - Screen Ireland, RTÉ, Broadcasting Authority of Ireland, BeTV Belgium and BNP Paribas Fortis Film Fund (France). The film was distributed in Ireland through Wildcard.

It was released on Amazon Prime Video in Ireland and the UK on 4 June 2020, followed by a theatrical release in Ireland. The film was released in the USA on 11 November 2020.

Plot
The film is set in 1995 in The Curragh, Ireland where outsiders Eddie and Amber, two teenagers distraught over persistent homophobic abuse, decide to hide their sexuality from the rural Irish town in which they live by pretending to be a heterosexual couple.  Amber wants to escape a life overshadowed by the suicide of her father to lead a lesbian punk life-style in a more liberal environment. She is saving money to move to London by surreptitiously renting out caravans to teenage couples in need of some privacy on a park her mother runs.  Eddie is not so confident of his sexuality and intends to follow his insensitive and often absent father into the Irish Army.

On trips to Dublin the "couple" begin to absorb its gay culture.  Eddie is seen passionately kissing another man in a gay bar by someone from his home town.  This causes Eddie to panic and attack the witnesses to his kiss. Meanwhile, Amber begins an affair with Sarah, a girl she meets in Dublin.

Amber comes out to her Mum who meets Sarah and understands that her daughter wants and needs to be with her girlfriend.  Amber is then outed to the town through the local priest.  Initially Eddie can't accept that his pretense with Amber is over but then tries to establish a heterosexual relationship with schoolmate Tracey prior to joining the army. When he is due to enlist Amber appears at the barracks and offers him her savings to help him escape living a lie. He accepts his sexuality and the money to buy a train ticket to another life. Eddie opens the box containing Amber's savings, revealing half of the photo booth picture inside, the movie ends with both of them smiling, finally accepting who they really are.

Cast

Production
David Freyne directed the film with Rachael O'Kane and John Keville of Atomic 80 producing in co-production with Belgian company Wrong Men. The film received funding and production support from Screen Ireland and the Broadcasting Authority of Ireland. Will Clarke, Andy Mayson, and Mike Runagall of Altitude, Dearbhla Regan of Screen Ireland, and Rory Dungan of Wildcard executive produced. Principal photography took place in summer 2019.

Release
Wildcard released the film in Ireland and Altitude handled UK and some international distribution; this announcement came with a first look promotional image. It was announced along with a trailer in May 2020 that the film would premiere on Amazon Prime Video available in the UK and in Ireland in June before a later Irish theatrical release on 3 July.

Samuel Goldwyn Films acquired the North American rights. The company released a trailer for the film in September. Dating Amber was showcased at the Canadian Inside Out Film and Video Festival in October. The film was available in North America digitally and on-demand from 13 November. It has since been available to stream on HBO Max.

Reception
The website's critics consensus reads, "Dating Amber colors outside the rom-com lines to tell a sweetly poignant story about friendship and self-acceptance."

Awards and nominations

References

External links

2020 films
2020 comedy-drama films
2020 LGBT-related films
2020s coming-of-age comedy-drama films
Films set in 1995
LGBT-related buddy comedy-drama films
LGBT-related coming-of-age films
Irish coming-of-age comedy-drama films
Irish LGBT-related films
English-language Irish films
2020s English-language films
Films shot in County Kildare